Thomas de Berkeley (c. 1293 or 1296 – 27 October 1361), known as The Rich, feudal baron of Berkeley, of Berkeley Castle in Gloucestershire, England, was a peer. His epithet, and that of each previous and subsequent head of his family, was coined by John Smyth of Nibley (d. 1641), steward of the Berkeley estates, the biographer of the family and author of Lives of the Berkeleys.

Origins
He was the eldest son and heir of Maurice de Berkeley, 2nd Baron Berkeley by his wife, Eva la Zouche.

Career
In 1327 he was made joint custodian of the deposed King Edward II, whom he received at Berkeley Castle. He was later commanded to deliver custody of the king to his fellow custodians, namely John Maltravers, 1st Baron Maltravers and Sir Thomas Gournay. He left the king at Berkeley Castle and with heavy cheere perceiving what violence was intended he journeyed to Bradley. The king was murdered at Berkeley Castle during his absence. As an accessory to the murder of the deposed king, he was tried by a jury of 12 knights in 1330 and was honourably acquitted.

Marriages and children

He married twice:
Firstly to Margaret Mortimer, daughter of Roger Mortimer, 1st Earl of March and Joan de Geneville, by whom he had five children:
 Maurice de Berkeley, 4th Baron Berkeley (born 1320,- 8 June 1368), The Valiant, eldest son and heir.
 Thomas de Berkeley (born c. 1325, date of death unknown)
 Roger de Berkeley (born 1326, date of death unknown)
 Alphonsus de Berkeley (born 1327, date of death unknown)
 Joan de Berkeley (born 1330, date of death unknown), wife of Reginald de Cobham, 1st Baron Cobham.
Secondly on 30 May 1347 he married Catherine Clevedon (1321 – 13 March 1428.) C/Katharine founded a school that still operates. They had four children as follows:
 Thomas Berkeley (born 7 June 1348, date of death unknown)
 Maurice de Berkeley (27 May 1349 – 3 June 1368)
 Edmund de Berkeley (born 10 July 1350, date of death unknown)
 John Berkeley (1352 – 1428) of Beverstone Castle, Gloucestershire, a secondary residence of his father's.

Death and succession
He died on 27 October 1361 in Gloucestershire and was succeeded by Maurice de Berkeley, 4th Baron Berkeley (born 1320, date of death unknown), eldest son and heir from his first marriage.

References

Ancestral roots of certain American colonists who came to America before 1700,  Frederick Lewis Weis, 1992, seventh edition.
Ancestral roots of sixty colonists who came to New England 1623–1650.  Frederick Lewis Weis (earlier edition).
Magna Charta Sureties, 1215, Frederick Lewis Weis, Walter Lee Sheppard, Jr., William R. Beall, 1999, 5th Ed.
Magna Charta Sureties, 1215, Frederick Lewis Weis, 4th Ed.
The Complete Peerage, Cokayne.
Burke's Peerage, 1938.
Plantagenet Ancestry of Seventeenth-Century Colonists, David Faris,  Genealogical Publishing Co., Inc., 1996.
Royal Genealogy information held at University of Hull.

1290s births
1361 deaths
Year of birth uncertain
3
People from Berkeley, Gloucestershire
Thomas